The Moskva (Moskvá-reká) is a river running through western Russia.

History
In addition to Finnic tribes, the Moskva River is also the origin of Slavic tribes such as the Vyatichi tribe.

Etymology
Moskva and Moscow are two different renderings of the same Russian word Москва. The city is named after the river. Finnic Merya and Muroma people, who originally inhabited the area, called the river Mustajoki, in English: Black river. It has been suggested that the name of the city derives from this term, although several theories exist. To distinguish the river and the city, Russians usually call the river Moskva-reka (Moskva river) instead of just Moskva.

Hydrology

Normally, it freezes in November–December and begins to thaw around late March. In Moscow, the river freezes occasionally; during an unusually warm winter in 2006–2007, ice began melting on January 25.

Sources of water
The main tributaries of the Moskva are, from source to mouth:

 Ruza (left)
 Istra (left)
 Skhodnya (left)
 Setun (right)
 Yauza (left)
 Pakhra (right)
 Pekhorka (left)
 Nerskaya (left)
 Severka (right)

Sources of water are estimated as 61% thaw, 12% rain and 27% subterranean. Since completion of the Moscow Canal (1932–1937), the Moskva River has also collected a share of Upper Volga water. This has enabled reliable commercial shipping, which was previously interrupted by summer droughts (older dams built in 1785, 1836 and 1878 were not effective).

Cities and towns

Moscow, the capital of Russia, is situated on its banks. The river also flows through the towns of Mozhaysk, Zvenigorod, Zhukovsky, Bronnitsy, Voskresensk, and — at the confluence of the Moskva and Oka — Kolomna. As of 2007, there are 49 bridges across the Moskva River and its canals within Moscow city limits; the first stone bridge, Bolshoy Kamenny Bridge, was erected in 1692. Drinking water for the city of Moscow is collected from five stations on the Moskva River and from the Upper Volga reservoirs (north and north-west of the city).

Islands
Canals, built within Moscow city limits, have created a number of islands. Some of them have names in Russian, some have none. Major, permanent islands (west to east) are:
Serebryany Bor. Separated from the mainland in the 1930s.
Tatarskaya Poyma, commonly known as Mnyovniki. Separated from the mainland in the 1930s
Balchug Island, also known as Bolotny Ostrov, lying just opposite the Kremlin. The island was formed by the construction of the Vodootvodny Canal in the 1780s, and has no official name in Russian. Moscow residents informally call it "Bolotny Ostrov" (Bog Island) while members of Moscow's English-speaking community refer to it as Balchug.
One uninhabited island north of Nagatino.
Three uninhabited islands east of Nagatino, connected by the Pererva dam and lock system.

Recreation

There is a fleet of river ice-breaker cruisers which ply routes from moorings at the Hotel Ukraine and Gorky Park to the Novospassky Monastery and back. Duration of trips ranges from 1.5 to 3 hours.

References

External links
 

Rivers of Moscow Oblast
Rivers of Smolensk Oblast
Rivers of Moscow